The Seaboard Air Line Railroad depot in Monroe, Union County, North Carolina, United States, is a former train station formerly used by the Seaboard Air Line Railroad from 1874 to 1969.

History

Train service to Monroe began in 1874 when the Carolina Central Railway between Charlotte and Wilmington was completed.  This made Monroe a market town where agricultural products were sold and shipped from the North to the South and vise-versa.  Due to the agricultural trade, it made Monroe a very important town and junction on the railroad along with the supply lines.  In 1892, construction of the Georgia, Carolina and Northern Railway to Atlanta made new connections to other cities.

Current station building

In 1906, the Seaboard Air Line Railroad made 2 new depots for Monroe.  It included the current station building that was constructed with pressed brick, terra cotta panels, Ornate chimneys and Queen Anne style architecture window slashes.  A new freight depot was also built but sadly no longer exists.

Trains that stopped here

Cotton Blossom
Passenger Mail and Express
Silver Comet

Decline and present

Ever since the 1950s rail passenger service has been in decline due to new interests such as the car and plane.  One such event came in 1958 when the Charlotte-Wilmington local train on the route serving the station was discontinued. In the 1960s, rail traffic even declined more across the United States.  The final blow came on October 14, 1969 when the Silver Comet was discontinued.  After the Silver Comet ended passenger services to Monroe, the station was still used as a yard office for the railroad and still maintains that usage to this date.  Currently, CSX owns the station building after acquiring the former SAL routes through the merger of the Seaboard System and the Chessie System.

References

Former railway stations in North Carolina
Railway stations in the United States opened in 1874
Railway stations in the United States opened in 1906
Buildings and structures in Union County, North Carolina
1874 establishments in North Carolina
1906 establishments in North Carolina
Railway stations closed in 1969
Former Seaboard Air Line Railroad stations
Seaboard Air Line Railroad stations